Atrocity is a German heavy metal band from Ludwigsburg that formed in 1985.

History
First started in 1985 as Instigators and playing grindcore, Atrocity arose as a death metal band with their debut EP, Blue Blood, in 1989, followed soon by Hallucinations, a concept album about drug use. Their second album, Todessehnsucht ("longing for death"), ventured into death metal classics with a cover of "Archangel" by the band Death. Their musical scope broadened over the years, incorporating medieval and horror influences on their 1994 Dracula-based concept album Atrocity's Blut, (styled after the successful film Bram Stoker's Dracula). Atrocity's Blut was followed by Calling the Rain, an MCD with female vocals by guest singer Yasmin Krull and acoustic music.

The 1996 release Willenskraft introduced industrial elements, with the special bonus CD of the album's special edition (Kraft und Wille) including electronic remixes of the songs. The later releases were less and less metallic; Werk 80 featured versions of 1980s disco hits and the band had no apparent direction for the following few years. Unusual MCD releases and experimental songs like "Lili Marlene" covers (featured on Gemini) estranged many of their original metal fans.

After 2000, nothing had been heard from Atrocity and seemed to have disbanded. However, they returned after four years with a new concept album, Atlantis, centered on the myths of the sunken continent of Atlantis. The album also features the vocals of Alexander's wife, Liv-Kristine Espanaes Krull (formerly in Theatre of Tragedy). The band members also formed the atmospheric metal band Leaves' Eyes, which features Liv Kristine as lead singer.

The release of the eleventh album After the Storm in 2010 started a new era for the band in the ethno metal genre. Yasmin Krull returned a second time as guest singer and instrumentalist for the project.

On 11 November 2007, Atrocity announced that bassist Chris Lukhaup was leaving the band for personal reasons and that drummer Moritz Neuner was taking another turn in his working career. Seven Antonopolous was named as the new drummer in late October 2008.

Members

Current members
Alexander Krull – vocals, keyboards, samples (1985–present)
Joris Nijenhuis – drums (2012–present)
Micki Richter - guitars (2019-present)
Andrea Nasso - bass (2021-present)
Luc Gebhardt - guitars (2022-present)

Former members
René Tometschek – bass (1985–1988)
Gernot Winkler – drums (1985–1988)
Mathias Röderer – guitars (1985–2010)
Frank Knodel – guitars (1985–1988)
Oliver Klasen – bass (1988–1993)
Michael Schwarz – drums (1988–1999)
Richard Scharf – guitars (1988–1994)
Markus Knapp – bass (1994–1995)
Christian Lukhaup – bass (1995–2007)
Martin Schmidt – drums (1999–2005)
Moritz Neuner – drums (2005–2008)
Alla Fedynitch – bass (2008–2010)
Seven Antonopoulos – drums (2008–2010)
Nicholas Barker – drums (2008)
JB van der Wal – bass (2010–2013)
Roland Navratil – drums (2010–2012)
Sander van der Meer – guitars (2010–2015)
Pete Streit – guitars (2015–2019)
Thorsten Bauer – guitars (1994–2021), bass (2013–2021)

Timeline

Discography

Studio albums
 1990: Hallucinations
 1992: Todessehnsucht
 1994: Blut
 1996: Willenskraft
 2000: Gemini 
 2004: Atlantis
 2010: After the Storm
 2013: Okkult
 2018: Okkult II
 2023: Okkult III

Compilations
 1995: Calling the Rain (acoustic album)
 1995: Die Liebe (collaboration album)
 1996: Kraft & Wille (video collection & The Hunt EP)
 1997: Werk 80 (cover album)
 1999: Non Plus Ultra: 1989–1999 (best-of)
 2008: Werk 80 II (cover album)

DVD
2012: Die Gottlosen Jahre

Demos
 1988: Instigators
 1993: Promo '93

EPs
 1996: The Hunt
 1996: The Definition of Kraft and Wille
 2017: Masters of Darkness
 2019: Spell of Blood

Music videos

References

External links 

 
 

1985 establishments in West Germany
German death metal musical groups
German heavy metal musical groups
German gothic metal musical groups
Massacre Records artists
Musical groups established in 1985
Napalm Records artists
Nuclear Blast artists
Roadrunner Records artists